Zoopark Tirana is a public zoo located in Tirana, Albania. It is the only zoo of its kind in the country.

Infrastructure 
Presently the infrastructure of the zoo is in a bad state, needing funds for reparations and animal care. There are not many animals on display, just some: bears, lions, llamas, monkeys, wolves, foxes, and some birds. The cages are small, not very clean and visitors are advised not to stress the animals. Despite its poor appearance, the zoo is still popular with local visitors and children who come here to play.

Controversy
The zoo has been described by many visitors as an animal prison, mostly because of the bad conditions in which the animals live.

On 2015 it was closed because a video footage was released,  in which a bull attacked a donkey and nothing was done to help the animal. Animal Activists and Environmentalists always pressured the local authorities to close the zoo down and end the cruelty towards the animals kept there.

Tirana's Municipality recently announced its intention to extend the zoo into a park, creating better conditions for the animals. The natural landscape of the zoo full of trees and green spaces has been tarnished considerably with the rise of new apartment flats in the area.

References

Buildings and structures in Tirana
1966 establishments in Albania
Zoos established in 1966
Tourist attractions in Tirana
Zoos in Albania